Joseph Dennison Norman (born October 15, 1956) is a former professional American football linebacker in the National Football League. He played five seasons for the Seattle Seahawks.

References 

1956 births
Living people
People from Millersburg, Ohio
Players of American football from Ohio
American football linebackers
Indiana Hoosiers football players
Seattle Seahawks players